Asbi’a is a Libyan town located about 45 km south of Tripoli 

Libya articles missing geocoordinate data
Tripoli, Libya
Baladiyat of Libya